Ezra Wheeler (December 23, 1820 – September 19, 1871) was a U.S. Representative from Wisconsin.

Born in Chenango County, New York, Wheeler received a liberal preparatory schooling and graduated from Union College, Schenectady, New York, in 1842.
He moved to Berlin, Wisconsin, in 1849.
He studied law and was admitted to the bar commencing practice in Berlin, Wisconsin.
He served as member of the Wisconsin State Assembly in 1853.
He served as judge of Green Lake County 1854–1862.

Wheeler was elected as a Democrat to the Thirty-eighth Congress (March 4, 1863 – March 3, 1865) as the representative of Wisconsin's newly created 5th congressional district, defeating Edward L. Browne.
He resumed the practice of law in Berlin, Wisconsin.
On account of ill health, he moved to Pueblo, Colorado, in 1870.
He was appointed register of the land office in Pueblo on June 27, 1871, and served until his death there on September 19, 1871.
He was interred in Oakwood Cemetery, Berlin, Wisconsin.

References

1820 births
1871 deaths
Democratic Party members of the Wisconsin State Assembly
Wisconsin state court judges
Democratic Party members of the United States House of Representatives from Wisconsin
19th-century American politicians
19th-century American judges